
Gmina Strzelin is an urban-rural gmina (administrative district) in Strzelin County, Lower Silesian Voivodeship, in south-western Poland. It is part of the Wrocław metropolitan area.

Neighbouring gminas
Gmina Strzelin is bordered by the gminas of Borów, Ciepłowody, Domaniów, Kondratowice, Przeworno, Wiązów and Ziębice.

Villages
Apart from the town of Strzelin, the gmina contains the villages of Biały Kościół, Biedrzychów, Bierzyn, Brożec, Chociwel, Częszyce, Dankowice, Dębniki, Dobrogoszcz, Gębczyce, Gębice, Gęsiniec, Głęboka, Gliczyna, Góra, Górzec, Gościęcice, Grabiny, Kaczów, Karszów, Karszówek, Kazanów, Krzepice, Kuropatnik, Ludów Polski, Maszyce, Mikoszów, Mojków, Muchowiec, Myszkowice, Nieszkowice, Nowolesie, Pęcz, Piotrowice, Pławna, Skoroszowice, Strzegów, Szczawin, Szczodrowice, Trześnie, Ulsza, Warkocz, Wąwolnica, Żeleźnik and Zimne Doły.

Twin towns – sister cities

Gmina Środa Śląska is twinned with:

 Frankenberg, Germany
 Libchavy, Czech Republic
 Straelen, Germany
 Svitavy, Czech Republic
 Trutnov, Czech Republic

References

Strzelin
Strzelin County